Jon Benjamin Has a Van is an American live-action television comedy series that aired in the summer of 2011 on Comedy Central. The series stars Jon Benjamin as a reporter who toured around in a van to deliver uninteresting news to viewers and unsuspecting people while utilizing scripted scenes for narrative reasons. The series' cancellation was announced in April 2012. Special guest roles included Patton Oswalt, David Cross, Jon Glaser, Eric Wareheim, Tim Heidecker, Kurt Braunohler, Matt Walsh, Ian Roberts, Jay Johnston, Bob Odenkirk, Chloé Dumas, Jerry Minor, Andy Richter, Larry Murphy, Rich Fulcher, Chris Parnell, Brendon Small, Nathan Fielder, and Metallica guitarist Kirk Hammett.

Episodes

References

External links
 
 

Comedy Central original programming
2010s American comedy television series
2011 American television series debuts
English-language television shows
2011 American television series endings
Television series by Funny or Die
Television series by Abso Lutely Productions
Television series by Gary Sanchez Productions